Indoor Hockey Asia Cup may refer to:

Men's Indoor Hockey Asia Cup
Women's Indoor Hockey Asia Cup